The "150 women in 150 words" project was undertaken by the Royal Society Te Apārangi and published during their 150th anniversary celebrations in 2017. The aim of the project was "celebrating women’s contributions to expanding knowledge in New Zealand", and involved short online biographies of a range of women from early Polynesian settlers to present-day scientists.

The biographies are arranged on the Royal Society Te Apārangi's website in four categories: pre-1866 (of which there are two, Whakaotirangi and Kahupeka), 1867–1917, 1918–1967, and 1968–to the present time. The full list of biographies below is arranged alphabetically by (most commonly used) surname.

References 

Lists of women scientists
Lists of New Zealand women
Royal Society of New Zealand